Rune Bertil Leopold Sörmander (1929-2020) was an international speedway rider from Sweden.

Speedway career 
Sörmander was one of speedway's leading riders during the 1950s and 1960s, he was a three times champion of Sweden, winning the Swedish Championship in 1955, 1958 and 1959. On 22 June 1952 he won the Continental Speedway Final, which formed part of the 1952 Individual Speedway World Championship.

He reached the final of the Speedway World Championship on seven occasions (1953, 1957, 1958, 1959, 1960, 1961, 1962) and the final of the Individual Speedway Long Track World Championship three times (1959, 1961, 1962).

He also helped Sweden win the World Team Cup in 1960, 1962, 1963 and 1964

He rode in the top tier of British Speedway, riding for various clubs.

World Final appearances

Individual World Championship
 1953 -  London, Wembley Stadium - 11th - 5pts
 1957 -  London, Wembley Stadium - 5th - 11pts + 1pt
 1958 -  London, Wembley Stadium - 13th - 4pts
 1959 -  London, Wembley Stadium - 11th - 6pts
 1960 -  London, Wembley Stadium - 12th - 5pts
 1961 -  Malmö, Malmö Stadion - 8th - 7pts
 1962 -  London, Wembley Stadium - 11th - 7pts

World Team Cup
 1960 -  Gothenburg, Ullevi (with Olle Nygren / Ove Fundin / Björn Knutsson) - Winner - 44pts (11)
 1961 -  Wrocław, Olympic Stadium (with Sören Sjösten / Ove Fundin / Björn Knutsson / Per Tage Svensson) - 2nd - 30pts (4)
 1962 -  Slaný (with Björn Knutsson / Sören Sjösten / Göte Nordin / Ove Fundin) - Winner - 36pts (3)
 1963 -  Vienna, Stadion Wien (with Björn Knutsson / Per Olof Söderman / Göte Nordin / Ove Fundin) - Winner - 37pts (3)
 1964 -  Abensberg, Abensberg Stadion (with Björn Knutsson / Göte Nordin / Ove Fundin / Sören Sjösten) - Winner - 34pts (7)

References 

1929 births
2020 deaths
Swedish speedway riders
Belle Vue Aces riders
Leicester Lions riders
Wembley Lions riders
People from Växjö
Sportspeople from Kronoberg County